Field Marshal Sir Claud William Jacob,  (21 November 1863 – 2 June 1948) was a British Indian Army officer. He served in the First World War as commander of the Dehra Dun Brigade, as General Officer Commanding 21st Division and as General Officer Commanding II Corps in the Fifth Army. During the Battle of the Somme, his corps undertook the British attack during the Battle of Thiepval Ridge in September 1916 and the subsequent assault on St Pierre Divion during the Battle of the Ancre in November 1916. He remained in command of II Corps for the Battle of Passchendaele in Autumn 1917. After the War he commanded a corps of the British Army of the Rhine during the occupation there and then served as Chief of the General Staff in India. He went on to be General Officer Commanding Northern Command in India before temporarily becoming Commander-in-Chief, India and then taking over as Military Secretary to the India Office.

Military career
Jacob was born on 21 November 1863, at Mahidpur in the Bombay Presidency of British India, to Major-General William Jacob and Eliza Jacob.

Educated at Sherborne School, he passed into Sandhurst and was commissioned into the Worcestershire Regiment on 9 September 1882. On 16 December 1884, stationed at Quetta, he secured his transfer from the Worcestershire Regiment to the Indian service and, in July 1886, he became adjutant of the 30th Regiment (Jacob's) Bombay Native Infantry also known as 3rd Belooch Regiment (now 12 Baloch). He first saw action with the Zhob Valley expedition of 1890 after which he was posted to the 24th (Baluchistan) Regiment of Bombay Infantry (now 6 Baloch) in 1891. Promoted to captain on 9 September 1893 and to major on 10 July 1901, he was selected to command the Zhob Levy Corps, which kept the peace in the North West Frontier Province along the Waziristan and Southern Afghanistan border. He took part in the blockade of the Mahsud Waziri tribe at the end of 1901. Promoted to lieutenant-colonel on 1 October 1904, he was given command of the 106th Hazara Pioneers. Promoted to brevet colonel on 1 October 1908 and to full colonel on 1 January 1911, he was appointed GSO1 of the Meerut Division on 2 September 1912.

At the outbreak of the First World War in 1914, Jacob went with the Meerut division, part of the Indian corps, to the Western Front. He saw action at the closing stages of the Battle of La Bassée in October 1914. Promoted to temporary brigadier-general on 5 January 1915, he was appointed to command the Dehra Dun Brigade, and led the brigade at the Battle of Neuve Chapelle in March 1915 and the Battle of Aubers Ridge in May 1915. Promoted to temporary major-general on 7 September 1915, he became General Officer Commanding the Meerut division and led the division at the Battle of Loos in October 1915. With the Indian Corps was preparing to leave the Western front, he was appointed to take over the 21st Division of the "New Armies" on 18 November 1915. Promoted to the substantive rank of major-general on 1 January 1916 and despite being wounded in March 1916, he was promoted to temporary lieutenant-general on 28 May 1916 and appointed to command II Corps in the Fifth Army in September 1916. During the Battle of the Somme, his corps undertook the British attack during the Battle of Thiepval Ridge in September 1916 and the subsequent assault on St Pierre Divion during the Battle of the Ancre in November 1916. He remained in command of II Corps, having been promoted to the substantive rank of lieutenant-general on 3 June 1917, for the Battle of Passchendaele in Autumn 1917.

Jacob commanded a corps of the British Army of the Rhine during the occupation there. He became Chief of the General Staff in India in January 1920 and was then both promoted to full general and appointed Aide-de-Camp to King George V on 31 May 1920. He returned home to England in 1924, and in November of that year was given the Northern Command in India. When Lord Rawlinson died in March 1925, he acted temporarily as Commander-in-Chief, India, until Sir William Birdwood took over that role in August 1925 and Jacob returned home again. He took up the appointment of Military Secretary to the India Office in April 1926 and, having been promoted field marshal on 30 November 1926, he remained at the India Office until he retired in May 1930.

In retirement Jacob became Constable of the Tower of London. He was also Colonel of 2nd Battalion The Baluch Regiment (now 7th Battalion The Baloch Regiment), Colonel of the 106th Hazara Pioneers and Colonel of the Worcestershire Regiment. In January 1936 he attended the funeral of King George V and in May 1937 he attended the coronation of King George VI. He died at King's College Hospital in London on 2 June 1948 at the age of eighty-four.

Family

In 1894, he married Clara Pauline Wyatt, daughter of the Reverend J. L. Wyatt, well known as a missionary and student of oriental languages in India, and also a lecturer in Tamil at Cambridge University from 1895 to 1929. The couple had one son, Edward Ian Claud Jacob, who later became Assistant Military Secretary of the War Cabinet and Director-General of the BBC.

Honours
British
KCMG – 1 January 1919
GCSI – 3 June 1930 (KCSI – 1 January 1924)
GCB – 3 July 1926 (KCB – 1917; CB – 1915)
 Knight of Grace of the Venerable Order of Saint John – 19 June 1926
Foreign
Grand Officer of the Order of the Crown (Belgium) – 11 March 1918
Grand Officer of the Legion of Honour (France) – 15 December 1919
Croix de Guerre (France) – 7 January 1919
Distinguished Service Medal (United States) – 12 July 1919

References

Bibliography

External links
Images of Claud Jacob
Profile on Worcestershire Regiment site

 

|-

|-
 

|-
 

|-

|-
 

 

1863 births
1948 deaths
Foreign recipients of the Distinguished Service Medal (United States)
Graduates of the Royal Military College, Sandhurst
Worcestershire Regiment officers
British field marshals
British Commanders-in-Chief of India
Indian Army generals of World War I
Knights Grand Cross of the Order of the Bath
Knights Grand Commander of the Order of the Star of India
Knights Commander of the Order of St Michael and St George
People educated at Sherborne School
Constables of the Tower of London
Military personnel of British India
British Indian Army generals
Members of the Council of the Governor General of India